Hubert Riesner (born 18 August 1946) is a German long-distance runner. He competed in the marathon at the 1968 Summer Olympics representing West Germany.

References

1946 births
Living people
Athletes (track and field) at the 1968 Summer Olympics
German male long-distance runners
German male marathon runners
Olympic athletes of West Germany
Sportspeople from Frankfurt
20th-century German people